Lyubomir Vitanov (born 11 May 1981 in Gotse Delchev) is a Bulgarian football midfielder currently playing for Bansko.

Career
Born in Gotse Delchev, Vitanov started to play football in the local team, Pirin, before moving to Macedonian Tikveš Kavadarci in 2003.

Vitanov played for Pirin Blagoevgrad from June 2005 and made his official debut in Bulgarian A Professional Football Group in a match against Naftex Burgas on 10 September 2005. The result of the match was a 2-1 win for Pirin.

In January 2017, Vitanov returned to Bansko.

References

External links

Bulgarian footballers
1981 births
Living people
Association football midfielders
First Professional Football League (Bulgaria) players
PFC Pirin Gotse Delchev players
OFC Pirin Blagoevgrad players
PFC Minyor Pernik players
PFC Lokomotiv Plovdiv players
Ħamrun Spartans F.C. players
FC Bansko players
Expatriate footballers in Malta
Expatriate footballers in North Macedonia